Viscardi Andrade Guimarães (born 8 March 1984) is a Brazilian mixed martial artist who competes in the Welterweight division of Taura MMA. A professional competitor since 2006, he was also a contestant on The Ultimate Fighter: Brazil 2 before joining the Ultimate Fighting Championship, and has also formerly competed for Jungle Fight.

Mixed martial arts career

The Ultimate Fighter: Brazil
Andrade was a competitor on the second Brazilian season of The Ultimate Fighter. Andrade defeated Thiago Goncalves in the preliminary round, before being chosen as Team Werdum's fourth pick. Andrade fought Goncalves for the second time after he had been brought back as an injury replacement for Neilson Gomes, winning by TKO in the first round. Andrade then taunted Team Nogueira, causing friction between the teams.

In the quarter-final round, Andrade defeated David Vieira by unanimous decision to advance to the semis. He faced William Macário, losing by technical knockout in the third round.

Ultimate Fighting Championship
Andrade made his promotional debut against Bristol Marunde on 3 August 2013 at UFC 163. He won the fight via TKO in the first round.

Andrade faced Nico Musoke on 15 February 2014 at UFC Fight Night 36. Despite dropping and almost finishing Musoke in the first round, Andrade lost the fight via unanimous decision.

Andrade was expected to face promotional newcomer Andreas Ståhl on 26 July 2014 at UFC on Fox 12.  However, Andrade was forced from the bout due to injury and was replaced by promotional newcomer Gilbert Burns.

The bout with Andreas Ståhl has been rescheduled and is expected to take place on 27 June 2015 at UFC Fight Night 70. Subsequently, the bout was scrapped during the week leading up to the event as Ståhl was forced out of the bout with an injury.

Andrade faced Gasan Umalatov on 7 November 2015 at UFC Fight Night 77. He won the fight by unanimous decision.

Andrade faced Richard Walsh on 20 March 2016 at UFC Fight Night 85. Andrade won the fight via unanimous decision.  On 12 April 2016, USADA notified the UFC that Andrade had failed an out of competition drug test conducted on 7 March 2016.  Due a delay in testing the sample at the WADA-accredited lab in Rio de Janeiro, the fight vs. Walsh went forward.

In May 2017, Andrade was released from the company.

Post-UFC career
After the release Andrade competed in Europe's regional scene, amassing a 1–2 record.

On 27 August 2020, news surfaced that Andrade had signed a three-fight contract with Taura MMA and is expected to make his promotional debut on 23 October 2020.

Mixed martial arts record

|-
| Loss
| align=center|21–10 (1) 
|Mikhail Ragozin
|KO (punches)
|RCC: Intro 18
|
|align=center|1
|align=center|3:22
|Yekaterinburg, Russia
|
|-
| Loss
| align=center|21–9 (1) 
|Vyacheslav Vasilevsky
|Decision (unanimous)
|Russian Cagefighting Championship 9
|
|align=center|3
|align=center|5:00
|Ekaterinburg, Russia
|
|-
| Win
| align=center|21–8 (1) 
|Paolo Gomez
|TKO (punches)
|AFT 26
| 
|align=center|1
|align=center|0:45
|Curitiba, Brazil
|
|-
| Win
| align=center|20–8 (1) 
|Caik Monstrão
|TKO (punches)
|AFT 23
| 
|align=center|1
|align=center|2:12
|Curitiba, Brazil
|
|-
| Loss
| align=center|19–8 (1) 
|Alexander Shlemenko
|TKO (punches)
|Russian Cagefighting Championship 6
| 
|align=center|3
|align=center|3:37
|Chelyabinsk, Russia
|
|-
| Win
| align=center|19–7 (1) 
|Sergei Martynov
|KO (punches)
|Russian Cagefighting Championship intro 3
| 
|align=center|2
|align=center|1:35
|Ekaterinburg, Russia
|
|-
| Loss
| align=center|18–7 (1) 
| Abdoul Abdouraguimov
| Decision
| SHC 12 - Strength & Honor Championship 12
| 
| align=center|3
| align=center|5:00
| Le Grand-Saconnex, Switzerland
|
|-
|NC
| align=center|18–6 (1) 
| Richard Walsh
| No Contest (overturned)
| UFC Fight Night: Hunt vs. Mir
| 
| align=center|3
| align=center|5:00
| Brisbane, Australia
| Originally a unanimous decision win for Andrade; overturned after he tested positive for stanozolol.
|-
| Win
| align=center|18–6 
| Gasan Umalatov
| Decision (unanimous)
| UFC Fight Night: Belfort vs. Henderson 3
| 
| align=center| 3
| align=center| 5:00
| São Paulo, Brazil
|
|-
| Loss
| align=center| 17–6
| Nico Musoke
| Decision (unanimous)
| UFC Fight Night: Machida vs. Mousasi
| 
| align=center| 3
| align=center| 5:00
| Jaraguá do Sul, Brazil
| 
|-
| Win
| align=center| 17–5
| Bristol Marunde
| TKO (punches)
| UFC 163
| 
| align=center| 1
| align=center| 1:36
| Rio de Janeiro, Brazil
| 
|-
| Win
| align=center| 16–5
| Michel Vaz
| TKO (punches)
| Moema Fight
| 
| align=center| 1
| align=center| 0:31
| Moema, Brazil
| 
|-
| Win
| align=center| 15–5
| Paulo Silva
| TKO (punches)
| Brazil Combate
| 
| align=center| 2
| align=center| 2:30
| São Paulo, Brazil
| 
|-
| Win
| align=center| 14–5
| Elizeu Zaleski dos Santos
| Submission (rear-naked choke)
| Max Fight 11
| 
| align=center| 2
| align=center| 1:27
| Campinas, Brazil
| 
|-
| Win
| align=center| 13–5
| Dyego Roberto
| Submission (rear-naked choke)
| Dragon Fight São Paulo: Dragon Fight
| 
| align=center| 2
| align=center| 3:45
| Votuporanga, Brazil
| 
|-
| Win
| align=center| 12–5
| Marinho Moreira 
| Decision (split)
| Max Fight 10
| 
| align=center| 3
| align=center| 5:00
| São Paulo, Brazil
| 
|-
| Win
| align=center| 11–5
| Arimarcel Santos
| Decision (unanimous)
| Super Power Combat
| 
| align=center| 3
| align=center| 5:00
| Barueri, Brazil
| 
|-
| Loss
| align=center| 10–5
| Edilberto de Oliveira
| Decision (unanimous)
| Fight Club 1: Brazilian Stars
| 
| align=center| 2
| align=center| 5:00
| Rio de Janeiro, Brazil
| 
|-
| Win
| align=center| 10–4
| Flavio Alvaro
| KO (punches)
| Bitetti Combat 8: 100 Years of Corinthians
| 
| align=center| 1
| align=center| 0:34
| São Paulo, Brazil
| 
|-
| Win
| align=center| 9–4
| Adriano Verdelli
| Submission (rear-naked choke)
| Barueri Combat
| 
| align=center| 1
| align=center| 3:53
| Barueri, Brazil
| 
|-
| Win
| align=center| 8–4
| Anderson Crepaldi
| Submission (armbar)
| Super Challenge Pro
| 
| align=center| 1
| align=center| 0:48
| Itapetininga, Brazil
| 
|-
| Win
| align=center| 7–4
| Fernando Paulon
| Decision (unanimous)
| Watch Out Combat Show 8
| 
| align=center| 3
| align=center| 5:00
| Rio de Janeiro, Brazil
| 
|-
| Win
| align=center| 6–4
| Rafael Augusto
| Decision (unanimous)
| Itu Fight Championship
| 
| align=center| 3
| align=center| 5:00
| Itu, Brazil
| 
|-
| Loss
| align=center| 5–4
| Iuri Alcântara
| Decision (split)
| Jungle Fight 19: Warriors 3
| 
| align=center| 3
| align=center| 5:00
| São Paulo, Brazil
| 
|-
| Win
| align=center| 5–3
| Allyson Pinheiro
| KO (punches)
| First Class Fight 2
| 
| align=center| 1
| align=center| 4:33
| São Paulo, Brazil
| 
|-
| Win
| align=center| 4–3
| Everton Santana Pinto
| Decision (unanimous)
| Kawai Arena 1
| 
| align=center| 3
| align=center| 5:00
| São José dos Campos, Brazil
| 
|-
| Loss
| align=center| 3–3
| Leandro Silva
| Decision (unanimous)
| Beach Fight Festival
| 
| align=center| 3
| align=center| 5:00
| São Vicente, Brazil
| 
|-
| Loss
| align=center| 3–2
| Charles Oliveira
| TKO (punches)
| Predador FC 9: Welterweight Grand Prix
| 
| align=center| 2
| align=center| 2:47
| São Paulo, Brazil
| 
|-
| Win
| align=center| 3–1
| Rafael Silva
| Decision (unanimous)
| Predador FC 9: Welterweight Grand Prix
| 
| align=center| 3
| align=center| 5:00
| São Paulo, Brazil
| 
|-
| Win
| align=center| 2–1
| Adriano Freitas
| Submission (rear-naked choke)
| Mega Fight São Paulo - Mega Fight 3
| 
| align=center| 1
| align=center| 1:10
| São Bernardo do Campo, Brazil
| 
|-
| Win
| align=center| 1–1
| Ricardo Silva
| Submission (rear-naked choke)
| Mega Fight São Paulo: Mega Fight 3
| 
| align=center| 1
| align=center| 2:00
| São Bernardo do Campo, Brazil
| 
|-
| Loss
| align=center| 0–1
| Magno Almeida
| Submission (americana)
| Ichigeki: Brazil 2006
| 
| align=center| 1
| align=center| 3:55
| Bragança Paulista, Brazil
|

Mixed martial arts exhibition record

| Loss
| align=center| 3–1
| William Macário
| TKO (punches)
| The Ultimate Fighter: Brazil 2
| N/A (airdate)
| align=center| 3
| align=center| N/A
| São Paulo, Brazil
| 
|-
| Win
| align=center| 3–0
| David Vieira
| Decision (unanimous)
| The Ultimate Fighter: Brazil 2
| N/A (airdate)
| align=center| 2
| align=center| 5:00
| São Paulo, Brazil
| 
|-
| Win
| align=center| 2–0
| Thiago Gonçalves
| TKO (punches)
| The Ultimate Fighter: Brazil 2
| N/A (airdate)
| align=center| 1
| align=center| N/A
| São Paulo, Brazil
| 
|-
| Win
| align=center| 1–0
| Thiago Gonçalves
| Decision (majority)
| The Ultimate Fighter: Brazil 2
|  (airdate)
| align=center| 2
| align=center| 5:00
| São Paulo, Brazil
|

See also
 List of current UFC fighters
 List of male mixed martial artists

References

External links
 
 

1984 births
Living people
Brazilian male mixed martial artists
Brazilian practitioners of Brazilian jiu-jitsu
Brazilian sportspeople in doping cases
Doping cases in mixed martial arts
People awarded a black belt in Brazilian jiu-jitsu
Sportspeople from São Paulo (state)
Ultimate Fighting Championship male fighters
Welterweight mixed martial artists
Mixed martial artists utilizing Brazilian jiu-jitsu
People from Jales